The 1983 Formula Mondial North American Cup season was contested over 9 rounds. In this one-make engine formula all cars had to use Ford BDD engines. 57 different drivers competed in 8 different chassis.

Calendar

Final points standings

Driver

For every race the points were awarded: 30 points to the winner, 24 for runner-up, 19 for third place, 15 for fourth place, 12 for fifth place, 10 for sixth place, 9 seventh place, winding down to 1 point for 15th place. No additional points were awarded. All results count.

Note:

Race 4 and 9 not all points were awarded (not enough competitors).

See also
 Formula Mondial

Formula Atlantic
Atlantic Championship seasons
1983 in Canadian motorsport